Robin Coombes, better known as Farma G, is a singer and rapper, one half of UK hip-hop group Task Force, and a founding member of Bury Crew and the M.U.D. Family. He and his brother Chester P are both sons of the late musician Peet Coombes.

Early years 
Coombes was born in Sunderland but grew up in Canonbury, North London and still lives there today with his brother Chester P, his son Remus and his mother.

Discography 
You Know Who You Are (Low Life's Main Courses 'Food') (compilation, Low Life Records, 2003)
Seein' Red (Young and Restless Vol. 1) (compilation, YNR Productions, 2003)
You Know Who You Are (Life Before 40) (compilation, Low Life Records, 2005)
Love and Peace (Life Before 40) (compilation, Low Life Records, 2005)

References

External links
 

Living people
English male rappers
English male singers
People from Canonbury
Rappers from London
Year of birth missing (living people)